"Chapter Three: Make the Unsafe Choice" is the third episode of the first season of the American dark comedy crime television series Barry. The episode was written by Duffy Boudreau, and directed by series co-creator Bill Hader, who also serves as the main lead actor. It was first broadcast on HBO in the United States on April 8, 2018.

The series follows Barry Berkman, a hitman from Cleveland who travels to Los Angeles to kill someone but finds himself joining an acting class taught by Gene Cousineau, where he meets aspiring actress Sally Reed and begins to question his path in life as he deals with his criminal associates such as Monroe Fuches and NoHo Hank. In the episode, Barry is instructed to kill a target for Pazar but is forced to delay the action per Hank's orders. His class is also the subject of a police investigation, as authorities found a connection between Ryan and the class. Sally has an audition, but meeting a former friend causes her to break down.

According to Nielsen Media Research, the episode was seen by an estimated 0.595 million household viewers and gained a 0.2 ratings share among adults aged 18–49. The episode received positive reviews from critics, who praised the performances, dark humor and character development.

Plot
Barry (Bill Hader) is surveilling the house from his new target, Paco, ready to kill him from a distance. However, Hank (Anthony Carrigan) calls him to delay the murder, as he wants to send the Bolivians a bullet through the mail just as they are informed of Paco's death. Despite risking his cover, Barry is forced to comply as Fuches (Stephen Root) is still hostage. 

While working as a party princess, Sally (Sarah Goldberg) is informed by her agent that there is an audition for a We Bought a Zoo television adaptation, where Sally could play an extra. Pazar (Glenn Fleshler) informs Hank that they will get a new assassin, Stovka, and they are excited given his track record. Stovka (Larry Hankin), an old man who barely moves, arrives to stand guard on the garage where Fuches is held. Pazar instructs Stovka to kill both Barry and Fuches when Barry returns, panicking Fuches, who overheard the conversation.

Detective Moss (Paula Newsome) is informed by her partner, Detective Loach (John Pirruccello) that Ryan Madison had an affair with Pazar's wife, linking him to the murder but they still question who killed the Chechens at the crime scene. They deduce that because Ryan was unfamiliar with the city, he must have been with a member from his acting class. They decide to go to the class and question Gene (Henry Winkler) and his students. Meanwhile, a desperate Fuches attempts to talk Stovka out of killing him and Stovka reveals his unhappiness following his wife and child abandoning him. Stovka then kills himself with the gun, shocking Fuches and Pazar.

The detectives interrogate all students separately to find their connection to Ryan. During the interrogation, Gene uses the opportunity to flirt with Moss, who does not seem interested in him. Sally asks for Barry to help her get to her audition and he agrees, despite knowing the bullet's arrival could interfere. At her audition, Sally finds that a former friend, Liv (Kat Foster), is also auditioning. They previously worked in a failed series named Bonnie and the Boston Bombers. Sally is speechless when Liv reveals that she is playing the lead of the series and was the one who advocated for her audition. During her audition, Sally is so devastated by the event that she breaks down. Fuches dines with Pazar, where they both seem to bond over their possible actions against the Bolivian Mafia. Fuches suggests that Pazar could lure Cristobal Sifuentes, the leader of the Bolivians, to Los Angeles by taking one of his houses and then he could kill him, which seems to intrigue Pazar. 

The bullet is finally delivered and Barry is told by Hank to finally go and kill Paco. However, Sally leaves her audition, devastated. She wants to be with him for comfort but Barry tells her he needs to go. That night, he struggles in killing Paco from a distance as Sally keeps calling him. Eventually, Barry tells her he'll go with her and decides to kill Paco in his house. Paco attempts to flee but Barry tackles him outside and then strangles him to death. He arrives at her house, where she wonders what her acting future will be and then they kiss. Barry then imagines a life where he and Sally shop together, before cutting to the present, where they both had sex. He remembers Paco's last words (which were said in Spanish) and asks Sally what it means. She says "you don't have to do this".

Production

Development
In February 2018, the episode's title was revealed as "Chapter Three: Make the Unsafe Choice" and it was announced that Duffy Boudreau had written the episode while series creator and main actor Bill Hader had directed it. This was Boudreau's first writing credit, and Hader's third directing credit.

Reception

Viewers
The episode was watched by 0.595 million viewers, earning a 0.2 in the 18-49 rating demographics on the Nielson ratings scale. This means that 0.2 percent of all households with televisions watched the episode. This was a 8% decrease from the previous episode, which was watched by 0.641 million viewers with a 0.2 in the 18-49 demographics.

Critical reviews
"Chapter Three: Make the Unsafe Choice" received positive reviews. Vikram Murthi of The A.V. Club gave the episode a "B+" and wrote, "Barry tends to focus on two kinds of people: Those who want to be the best, and those who are the best and are miserable because of it. 'Chapter Three: Make The Unsafe Choice', written by Duffy Boudreau, follows three characters who fit somewhere into those two categories. First, Sally Reed, an ambitious, aspiring actress who’s convinced that relentless determination will overcome any obstacles in her path to become a movie star. Second, Stovka, the best assassin in all of Chechnya turned inconsolable depressive after a long life plagued by death. Finally, there's Barry, another world-class assassin who knows it's not too late to pivot towards something more meaningful and less destructive." 

Nick Harley of Den of Geek gave the episode a 4 star rating out of 5 and wrote, "This was another extremely well-crafted, tight episode. It was great to see the show stretching out, taking the focus off of Barry a bit more and exploring some of the other characters." Charles Bramesco of Vulture gave the episode a 3 star rating out of 5 and wrote, "The episode's B-plot introduces a foil for Barry in the ancient Chechen assassin Stovka, a warning of the harrowing future that awaits him. A lifetime of causing pain has left Stovka a shell of himself, seeing no cure for his own guilt but suicide. The scenes between Fuches and Stovka hit a rarefied high of gallows humor, but they're the also the darkest passages that the show has produced yet. Even on the long term, for Barry, the stakes are life and death. He cannot continue making a living killing. It'll be the end of him — the only question is who will be holding the gun."

Accolades
TVLine named Sarah Goldberg as an honorable mention as the "Performer of the Week" for the week of April 14, 2018, for her performance in the episode. The site wrote, "Sally was thrilled to get an audition for an upcoming pilot, but her face fell when she learned an obnoxious former co-star of hers was already cast as the lead, and only brought her in as a favor. The normally upbeat Sally was heartbroken, and Goldberg was devastatingly vulnerable as Sally faked her way through congratulating her frenemy before completely bombing the biggest audition of her life. It actually takes great acting to play a bad actor — and Goldberg was very bad this week indeed."

References

External links
 "Chapter Three: Make the Unsafe Choice" at HBO
 

Barry (TV series) episodes
2018 American television episodes
Television episodes directed by Bill Hader